Bromus briziformis is a species of brome grass known by the common name rattlesnake brome. The specific epithet briziformis comes from the resemblance of the grass to grasses of the genus Briza, particularly Briza maxima. The common name is derived from the resemblance of the spikelets to the rattles of rattlesnakes. The grass has a diploid number of 14.

Description

The lax and secund panicles have long spreading or drooping branches that bear solitary terminal spikelets. The glumes are smooth or slightly scabrous. The lemmas are ovate or slightly rhombic, have broad translucent margins, and are awnless. The caryopses are as long or shorter than the paleas, and are flat or slightly rolled inwards.

Habitat and distribution

Bromus briziformis grows in waste areas, disturbed areas, and road verges, on dry soils. It is native to southwest Eurasia, but naturalized throughout North America from New Mexico up to southern British Columbia, and scattered throughout the eastern United States.

References

External links
Jepson Manual Treatment
USDA Plants Profile
Photo gallery

briziformis